Neurophyseta camptogrammalis is a moth in the family Crambidae. It was described by George Hampson in 1912. It is found in Guatemala.

The larvae feed on Alsophila firma.

References

Moths described in 1912
Musotiminae
Moths of Central America